, a French magazine founded in 2007, edited by Élisabeth Lévy
Fabien Causeur (born 1987), French basketball player
Causerie, a French literary style of short informal essays mostly unknown in the English-speaking world